Walter Burch Jr. (May 2, 1908 – May 10, 1985), nicknamed "Double Duty", was an American Negro league baseball player in the 1930s and 1940s.  

A native of Atlanta, Georgia, Burch played catcher, second baseman, and shortstop for various teams in the 1930s and 1940s, including the Kansas City Monarchs and the Homestead Grays. He served as a manager for the Cleveland Buckeyes in 1942. Burch died in Detroit, Michigan in 1985 at age 77.

References

External links
 and Seamheads

Homestead Grays players
African-American baseball managers
African-American baseball coaches
Kansas City Monarchs players
Baltimore Black Sox players
Cleveland Buckeyes players
Cleveland Bears players
St. Louis–New Orleans Stars players
African-American baseball players
1908 births
1985 deaths
Baseball infielders